Edward J. Lowe, Jr. (March 26, 1946 – January 15, 2011) was an American journalist who wrote columns for Newsday and The Long Island Press.

Lowe began his journalism career as a high school newspaper columnist at St. Pius X Preparatory Seminary in Uniondale, New York.  He was editor of the newspaper at Marist College, from where he graduated in 1967.

After his daughter Colleen was born, Lowe became a daily reporter at the Suffolk Sun in August 1969. However, the paper folded soon after, and Lowe was hired by Newsday.

In 1976, Lowe became a featured columnist for Newsday, appearing three times a week.  In the early 2000s, Lowe hosted a one-hour weekday morning talk show on AM 540 WLUX (now WBWD).  In 2004, he accepted early retirement from Newsday and became a columnist for The Long Island Press and the Neighbor Newspapers group.

Lowe had two sons, Jed and Daniel, with his second wife Phyllis Singer, then an editor at "Newsday." Lowe also hosted a cable television program.  He was known for his wit and ability to capture average people and their stories.

Bibliography
 Ed Lowe's Long Island.
 Not As I Do: A Father's Report.

as co-author with Stanley Siegel
 The Patient Who Cured His Therapist.
 Uncharted Lives.

Notes

Writers from Brooklyn
Marist College alumni
American male journalists
American columnists
American humorists
Newsday people
Long Island Press people
1946 births
2011 deaths
People from Uniondale, New York
20th-century American journalists